McWilliams House may refer to:

United States
(by state)
J.H. McWilliams House, listed on the National Register of Historic Places (NRHP)
McWilliams House (Lincoln, Nebraska), listed on the NRHP in Lancaster County
Matthew McWilliams House, Cincinnati, Ohio, listed on the NRHP in Hamilton County
Evarts-McWilliams House, Georgia, Vermont, listed on the NRHP in Franklin County

See also
Williams House (disambiguation)